Yellow mandarin is a common name for several plants and may refer to:

Prosartes lanuginosa
Prosartes maculata